is a Japanese professional footballer who plays as a defender for FC Ryukyu in the J3 League from 2023.

Career
Born in Fukuoka, Muta signed with Nagoya Grampus of the J. League Division 1 from Fukuoka University in January 2013. He made his debut for the club on 2 March 2013 against Júbilo Iwata; he started the game, playing 66 minutes before being substituted for Shohei Abe as Nagoya went on to draw the match 1–1.

On 23 December 2015, Muta signed to Kyoto Sanga from 2016 season.

On 7 August 2017, Muta was loaned out to JFL club, FC Imabari for during 2017 season. In Imabari, he participated in 10 league matches and returned to Kyoto in November at same year when the JFL season ended.

Muta not renewal contract after expiration with club for four years at Kyoto in 2019. After leave from Kyoto, On 21 January 2020, Muta signed transfer to J3 club, Iwate Grulla Morioka ahead of 2020 season. He leave from the club in 2022 after three years at Morioka, he was brought his club promotion to J2 for the first time in history from 2022 season, but after a season his club relegation to J3 from 2023.

On 27 December 2022, Muta officially transfer to J3 relegated club, FC Ryukyu for upcoming 2023 season.

Career statistics
Updated to the end of 2022 season.

References

External links
Profile at Kyoto Sanga

1990 births
Living people
Fukuoka University alumni
Association football people from Fukuoka Prefecture
Japanese footballers
J1 League players
J2 League players
J3 League players
Japan Football League players
Nagoya Grampus players
Kyoto Sanga FC players
FC Imabari players
Iwate Grulla Morioka players
FC Ryukyu players
Association football defenders